Sumitra Mahajan (née Sathe;  born: 12 April 1943) is an Indian politician who was the Speaker of Lok Sabha, the lower house of the Indian Parliament from 2014 to 2019. She belongs to Bharatiya Janata Party. She represented the Indore constituency of Madhya Pradesh from 1989 to 2019 as the longest serving Woman Member of Parliament,

She also served for as a Union Minister of State from 1999 to 2004, holding the portfolios for Human Resource Development, Communications and Information Technology and Petroleum and Natural Gas. She also held position of Chairperson of Standing Committee on Social Justice and Empowerment (2004-2009) and Standing Committee on Rural Development (2009-2014). She was the eldest and seniormost among woman Members of Parliament in the 16th Lok Sabha. She is the second woman after Meira Kumar to be elected as the Speaker of the Lok Sabha. She was awarded India's third highest civilian award the Padma Bhushan in 2021.

Early life and education
Sumitra Mahajan was born in a Chitpavan Brahmin Marathi family to Usha and Purushottam Sathe in Chiplun, Maharashtra. She received her MA and LLB from Indore University (now Devi Ahilya Vishwavidyalaya) after marrying Jayant Mahajan of Indore. Sumitra Mahajan's hobbies include reading, music, drama and cinema as well as an enthusiasm for singing. She has acknowledged the 18th century queen Ahilyabai Holkar as the inspirational figure throughout her life and has written a book on Ahilyabai Holkar's life journey 'Matoshree' which was unveiled by Prime Minister Narendra Modi in 2017.

Political career
Sumitra Mahajan started her political career as a corporator in the Indore Municipal Corporation in 1982. She was later elected as Deputy Mayor of Indore Municipal Corporation in 1984. 
She ran for the first time and won the Lok Sabha elections in 1989, against former Chief Minister and senior Congress leader Prakash Chandra Sethi. She is popularly known as Tai, among people of her constituency.

Speaker of the Lok Sabha
On 6 June 2014, Mahajan was unanimously elected as the Speaker of the 16th Lok Sabha. She had earlier worked as a member of the 'Panel of Chairmen' in the Lok Sabha. She took the step of suspending 25 Congress MPs for five days (August 2015) from House for indiscipline in the House.

 Key Patron at NLC Bharat

Controversy
Former chairperson of Indore-based Maharashtra Brahmin Cooperative Bank Anil Kumar Dhadwaiwale alleged Sumitra Mahajan and her son Milind Mahajan's roles were crucial in the scams that took place in the bank between 1997 and 2003. Sumitra Mahajan was a minister in the Central Government during this period.

Milind Mahajan was one of the directors of the bank when the alleged scam took place. In 2005, an FIR in the scam was lodged at Central Kotwali Police Station, Indore against 16 persons including Milind Mahajan. But it was removed after the investigation. Many directors including, Sumitra Mahajan's Private Secretary's husband also obtained the loan. But did not pay.

References

External links

 Official biographical sketch in Parliament of India website

|-

|-

1943 births
India MPs 1989–1991
India MPs 1991–1996
India MPs 1996–1997
India MPs 1998–1999
India MPs 1999–2004
India MPs 2004–2009
India MPs 2009–2014
India MPs 2014–2019
Bharatiya Janata Party politicians from Madhya Pradesh
Living people
Lok Sabha members from Madhya Pradesh
Politicians from Indore
Madhya Pradesh municipal councillors
People from Ratnagiri district
Speakers of the Lok Sabha
Union ministers of state of India
Women in Madhya Pradesh politics
20th-century Indian women politicians
20th-century Indian politicians
21st-century Indian women politicians
21st-century Indian politicians
Women union ministers of state of India
Women legislative speakers